The 2008 German Figure Skating Championships took place on January 3–6, 2008 at the Freiberger Arena in Dresden. Skaters competed in the disciplines of men's singles, ladies' singles, pair skating, ice dancing, and synchronized skating on the senior, junior, and novice levels.

The first senior compulsory dance was the Yankee Polka and the second was the Argentine Tango. The first junior compulsory dance was the Cha-Cha Congelado and the second was the Blues.

Medalists

Senior results

Men

Ladies

Pairs

Ice dancing

Synchronized

Junior results

Men

Ladies

Ice dancing

Synchronized

External links

 2008 German Championships: Senior, junior, novice pairs, novice ice dancing, and novice synchronized results
 2008 German Championships: Youth and novice singles results

German Figure Skating Championships, 2008
German Figure Skating Championships